Chippenham Town FC are an English football club based in Chippenham, Wiltshire, which plays in the Southern League Premier Division, the seventh highest tier in the English league system. They are nicknamed the Bluebirds and play their home matches at Hardenhuish Park. They are most noted as being the oldest football club in the South West of England.  Their home kit consists of a blue shirt, blue shorts and blue socks.

Key
Top scorer and number of goals scored shown in bold when he was also top scorer for the division.

Key to league record
 Lvl = Level of the league in the current league system
 S = Numbers of seasons
 Pld = Games played
 W = Games won
 D = Games drawn
 L = Games lost
 GF = Goals for
 GA = Goals against
 GD = Goals difference
 Pts = Points
 Position = Position in the final league table
 Overall position = Overall club position in the English league system

Key to cup records
 Res = Final reached round
 Rec = Final club record in the form of wins-draws-losses
 PR = Premilinary round
 QR1 = Qualifying round 1
 QR2 = Qualifying round 2
 QR3 = Qualifying round 3
 QR4 = Qualifying round 4
 R1 = Round 1
 R2 = Round 2
 R3 = Round 3
 R4 = Round 4
 R5 = Round 5
 R6 = Round 6
 QF = Quarter-finals
 SF = Semi-finals
 RU = Runners-up
 W = Winners

 Average home attendance = for league games only

Seasons

Notes on timeline
The club joined Division Two of the Western League in 1904, but also continued to play in the Wiltshire League. 
At the end of the 1905–06 season the club withdrew from the Western League.
Most competitive football was suspended in England between 1940 and 1945 due to World War II.
In the 1946-47 season the club did not play 3 of the scheduled matches due to the harshness of the weather.
In the 1947-48 season the club did not play the scheduled match against Soundwell.
The departures of 13 clubs from the Western League in 1960 meant that Division 2 was scrapped. The 20 remaining clubs + Exeter City Reserves became members of a single section competition, hence no promotion is recorded here.
The club, between the 1964-65 season and the beginning of the 1968-69 season, left the Western League and rejoined the Wiltshire League.
At the end of the 1972-73 season, the club transferred to the Western League.
The 1989-90 season saw the introduction of 3 points for a win.
The introduction of the English Football League pyramid system started around 1991 at which point the club were competing at Level 8
The Western League Premier Division became a Level 9 league in 2007 due to re-organisation of the lower league system.
Seasons where the club were successful in gaining promotion or winning a trophy are highlighted in green and relegation in red.

References 

Chippenham Town
Chippenham Town F.C.